Kazimierz Klemens Waliszewski (1849–1935) was a Polish author of history who wrote primarily about Russian history. He studied in Warsaw and Paris.

Background 

Waliszewski was born in Gole, in Congress Poland. He wrote detailed, scholarly works covering nearly three centuries of Russian history from Ivan the Terrible to the end of the nineteenth century. He began research in 1870, and devoted over thirty years of work in libraries and archives in Paris, London, Berlin, Vienna, and Saint Petersburg. Several of his works written in French were translated into other languages. Waliszewski also researched Polish history and his book Poland, the Unknown offers a defence of the country's history against hostile Russian and German interpretations.

As a man of letters, Waliszewski expressed his intention to introduce Joseph Conrad to the Polish public in 1903, after the two had exchanged a number of letters.

Selected books 
 
 
 
 
  The original edition at archive.org.

References 

1849 births
1935 deaths
20th-century Polish historians
Polish male non-fiction writers
Historians of Russia
Polish opinion journalists
19th-century Polish historians